The territory that is modern-day Portugal would be Romanized in the sequence of the Second Punic War (3rd century BCE), through the Roman conquest of the Iberian Peninsula.

The Romans would found cities as well as Romanize some previously existing settlements. As a general rule, cities with names ending in -briga are thought to have existed before the Romanization of the territory, but that is not always the case (e.g., Augustobriga, near Cáceres, Spain, clearly refers to Augustus, thus it is possible that some -briga names were still being given to cities during the Roman rule).

Of the 32 mansiones in the Lusitania mentioned in the old Itinerarium sources, only about half are currently identified.

Administrative divisions 

During the era of Augustus, the Iberian Peninsula was divided into the provinces of Lusitania, Baetica, and Tarraconensis. These provinces were then divided into conventūs. The province of Lusitania was divided into the conventūs of Augusta Emerita (modern-day Mérida, in Spain), Pax Julia (Beja, Portugal), and Scalabis (Santarém, Portugal). Yet, Roman cities were more important than conventūs in the Peninsula. The two main types of Roman cities were the coloniae (Roman settlements created by order of the Roman government) and the municipia (which typically existed before the Romanization). In the Iberian Peninsula, the terms municipia and civitātes are interchangeable. In 73/74 a.C.E., the lex Flavia municipalis by Vespasian would grant all urban centers of modern-day Portugal Latin rights and the distinction between urban centers (including municipia and coloniae) diminished over time after this law. Everyday administration was done by aediles, qaestores and duumviri, which communicated with the imperial government.

Villae were settlements that produced farming goods for the local markets and included multiple buildings, such as residential houses, barns, and gardens. In Lusitania, most villae were located around a few cities (Lisbon, Cascais, Évora and Mérida) or spread along the southern coast.

Map of Roman cities and towns in Portugal

List of Roman cities and towns in Portugal

References

External links
 As cidades romanas na Península Ibérica